Alexander Hume-Campbell, 2nd Earl of Marchmont  (167527 February 1740), was a Scottish nobleman, politician and judge.

Life
The third but eldest surviving son of Patrick Hume, 1st Earl of Marchmont, by his spouse Grisel (d.1703), daughter of Sir Thomas Ker of Cavers, he assumed the additional surname of Campbell upon his marriage in 1697 with Margaret (d. 1722), daughter and heiress of Sir George Campbell of Cessnock, Ayrshire.

He studied law at Utrecht University and became an advocate in 1696. He was appointed to the Court of Session in 1704 with the judicial title Lord Cessnock, and served there until 1714.

He was a Commissioner to the Parliament of Scotland for Berwickshire in 1706, and was a supporter of the Union with England.  He was Lord Clerk Register from 1716 to 1733.

He was ambassador to Denmark from 1715 to 1721, and to the Congress at Cambray in 1722.

He succeeded his father to the earldom in 1724, and was a Scottish representative peer from 1727 to 1734.

Alexander served as one of the founding governors of Britain's first childcare charity, the Foundling Hospital, which received its royal charter in 1739.

References

 The Peerage of Scotland, published by Peter Brown, Edinburgh, 1834, p. 146.
 

1675 births
1740 deaths
Members of the Parliament of Scotland 1689–1702
Members of the Parliament of Scotland 1702–1707
Earls of Marchmont
Scottish representative peers
Cessnock
Utrecht University alumni
Members of the Faculty of Advocates
Governors of the Bank of Scotland
Politics of the Scottish Borders
Ambassadors of Great Britain to Denmark
Shire Commissioners to the Parliament of Scotland
Burgh Commissioners to the Parliament of Scotland
Commissioners of the Treasury of Scotland